Fahrenheit is a tiny lunar impact crater located in the southeast part of the Mare Crisium. This area of the surface is nearly devoid of impact features of interest. To the east are the Dorsa Harker wrinkle ridges, and beyond them is Promontorium Agarum at the edge of the mare. The landing site of the Soviet Luna 24 probe is located about 15 kilometers to the southeast.

The crater is named after German-Dutch physicist Daniel Gabriel Fahrenheit. It was previously designated Picard X. The crater Picard is located to the east-northeast on the Mare Crisium.

References

External links

 LTO-62B1 Fahrenheit — L&PI topographic map

Impact craters on the Moon